Gaitanaki is a form of a Greek folk dance from Thessaly, Greece. It is a circle dance. It is also very widespread in Epirus.

See also
Music of Greece
Kalamatianos
Syrtos

References 

Greek dances
Circle dances